Profile Records was one of the earliest  hip hop labels. As well as hip-hop they released disco, dance, and electro records.

History
In 1980, Cory Robbins, who was 23 at the time and had worked briefly for MCA, wanted to start a record label. He invited his songwriter friend Steve Plotnicki to be a partner. They each borrowed $17,000 from their parents, purchased the little used Panorama Records subsidiary from MCA, and Profile Records was born. Their tiny office opened at 250 West 57th street in NYC on May 1, 1981.

With the success of “Genius Rap” by Dr. Jeckyll & Mr. Hyde, they escaped financial ruin by a mere $2,000. From there it was Gidea Park's “Seasons of Gold” that brought more commercial and financial success, becoming Profile Records’ first hit to make the Billboard Hot 100. In 1982 the fledgling label gained international recognition with the club hit  "I Specialize in Love", recorded by Sharon Brown, licensed to Virgin Records in the UK. The label continued its commercial success, with gold and platinum sales with artists such as Dana Dane, Twin Hype, Run DMC, Poor Righteous Teachers, Nemesis, and Paul Hardcastle among others.

In 1985, the label moved to a headquarters at 740 Broadway in New York. The label had numerous sub-labels such as Smile Communications (which later became independent and continued to be controlled by Plotnicki after Profile was acquired), Sea Bright Records, and Robert Hill's Zakia Records, the label that launched the career of King Sun and hip hop legends Eric B. & Rakim.

Profile's biggest act was Run-D.M.C., which was introduced to Robbins when manager Russell Simmons sent him a demo cassette of "It's Like That". Robbins signed the group soon after.

The partners' less than amicable split severed not only all business ties but all personal ones too. Robbins, in 2008, said he had no regrets “except for an occasional loss, it was a good experience, a positive experience but I would not change a thing.”

Profile was acquired by Arista Records in 1998, and its catalogue and artists were transferred to Arista. Sony Music Entertainment (owner of Arista since 2004) now manages much of Profile's back catalog and master recordings. Most recordings are currently out of print except for the albums of DJ Quik, Rob Base and DJ E-Z Rock and Run-D.M.C.

Artists

Hip hop

 Surf MC's
 2nd II None
 52nd Street
 Caveman
 Camp Lo
 Dana Dane
 DJ Quik
 Dr. Jeckyll & Mr. Hyde
 Rob Base and DJ E-Z Rock
 Nemesis
 Poor Righteous Teachers
 Derek B
 Run-D.M.C.
 Nine
 Pumpkin
 Special Ed
 Smoothe da Hustler
 Sweet Tee & Jazzy Joyce
 Twin Hype

Others

 Asher D & Daddy Freddy
 Boys Don't Cry
 Sharon Brown
 Cro-Mags
 The Cucumbers
 Leeway
 The LeRoi Brothers
 Paul Hardcastle
 Barrington Levy
 Murphy's Law
 Plasmatics
 Cutty Ranks
 Judy Torres
 The Accelerators
 The Nils
 Moev

References

American record labels
Record labels established in 1981
Record labels disestablished in 1997
Hip hop record labels
Reggae record labels
Arista Records
House music record labels
Sony Music